The Campeiro Bulldog is a breed of bulldog from Brazil.

Overview 
The Campeiro Bulldog was traditionally used in Brazil as a catch dog, catching and holding cattle, often in slaughterhouses. In the 1970s the use of such dogs was banned in Brazilian slaughterhouses and the breed's number declined to the point of extinction, this was further exacerbated by the increased popularity of imported dog breeds. In the mid-1970s a private breeding program was commenced to save the breed and numbers have gradually recovered, the breed was recognised by the Confederação Brasileira de Cinofilia in 2001.

The breed standard states the breed has a short, smooth coat that can be any colour except merle.

The breed is known to be aggressive to other dogs.

See also
 Dogs portal
 List of dog breeds

References 

Dog breeds originating in Brazil
Rare dog breeds
Bulldog breeds